The Roman Catholic Diocese of Matagalpa (erected 19 December 1924) is a suffragan of the Archdiocese of Managua.

Bishops

Ordinaries
Isidro Carrillo y Salazar (1924–1931)
Vicente Alejandro González y Robleto (1932–1938). appointed Coadjutor Archbishop of Managua
Isidro Augusto Oviedo y Reyes (1939–1946), appointed Bishop of León en Nicaragua
Octavio José Calderón y Padilla (1946–1970)
Julián Luis Barni Spotti, O.F.M. (1970–1982), appointed Bishop of León en Nicaragua
Carlos José Santi Brugia, O.F.M. (1982–1991)
Leopoldo José Brenes Solórzano (1991–2005), appointed Archbishop of Managua
Jorge Solórzano Pérez (2005–2010), appointed Bishop of Granada
Rolando José Álvarez Lagos (since 2011)

Auxiliary bishop
Miguel Obando Bravo, S.D.B. (1968-1970), appointed Archbishop of Managua (Cardinal in 1985)

Other priest of this diocese who became bishop
Pedro Lisímaco de Jesús Vílchez Vílchez, appointed Bishop of Jinotega in 1982

Territorial losses

See also
Catholic Church in Nicaragua

References

External links
 

Matagalpa
Matagalpa
Matagalpa
Matagalpa